Van Wassenaer is the name of an old Dutch noble family. It was first mentioned in the county of Holland on November 3, 1200. They are one of the few original noble families from Holland that has survived to this day. Members of the family carry the title of count or baron.

Origin of the name
The family was already noble from earliest times ("Uradel"). According to family legend, the name may be taken from the crescent (wassende) moon on the family coat of arms, borrowed from an Arabian banner that a member of the van Wassenaer family obtained while on a crusade. According to some family archives, Wassenaar means Wasser Herren, Sea Lords/Kings, which had been a traditional title that the invading Romans (under Caligula) had recognized while destituting the kings of Batavia.

History of the family

The founding father of the Wassenaer family was Philip, who lived in the early 13th century, and owned lands in Wassenaar. He was a vassal of William I, Count of Holland who took part in the Third Crusade and the Fifth Crusade.

Wassenaer branch 
Philip's son Dirk I founded the branches van Wassenaer, van Cranenburch and van Groenevelt. A seal of Dirk I of 1226 shows a different coat-of-arms than his later coat of arms, but the crescent may have served as crest at the time. The van Wassenaer branch was made Burgraves of Leiden by the Counts of Holland in 1340. In 1544 this branch extinguished.

Duvenvoorde branch 
Dirk's younger brother Filips received the Kasteel Duivenvoorde in 1226 and founded the branch van Duvenvoirde. His son Arend I van Duvenvoorde (†1268) continued the main Van Duvenvoorde branch. (which in the 17th century resumed the name van Wassenaer).

Polanen Branch

The Polanen branch descended from a younger brother of the Van Duvenvoorde branch. Arend I van Duvenvoorde had a younger brother Jan van Duvenvoirde (noted 1226-1248). He is the founding father of the Van Polanen branch. His son Philips III van Duivenvoorde (c. 1248 – after 1301) received the fief of Polanen (near Monster, South Holland) in 1295. His son Jan I van Polanen (ca. 1285 – 1342) then named himself van Polanen. In the early phases of the Hook and Cod wars, the Van Polanen family, and their bastard Willem van Duvenvoorde led the Hook faction. See: House of Polanen

The Van Polanen branch played an important role later on. It was through the marriage of Johanna van Polanen with Engelbert I of Nassau, that the House of Nassau first gained territories in the Netherlands, namely Breda. Much later this fact, among others, led to the House of Orange-Nassau's rise to the ruling dynasty of the country.

Other branches
The Duvenvoirde branch ended with Jacoba Maria van Wassenaar, baroness of Torck (1709–1771) whose descendants in the female line, the barons Schimmelpenninck van der Oye, still today own Kasteel Duivenvoorde.

Jacob II van Wassenaer Obdam (1645–1714) married Adriana Sophia von Raesfeld in 1676, who inherited Twickel Castle near Delden. The branch van Wassenaer Opdam was elevated to the rank of (non-ruling) imperial counts in 1711. This branch extinguished in 1850 with Marie Cornélie van Wassenaer Obdam (1799–1850) who left the castle to her children, barons van Heeckeren van Kell, who took on the name van Heeckeren van Wassenaer. Baroness Marie Amélie van Heeckeren van Wassenaer, née countess van Aldenburg Bentinck (1879–1975), gave the castle to her family foundation in 1953. It is now administrated by the heirs of her grand nephew, count Christian zu Castell-Rüdenhausen (1952–2010).

Jacob van Wassenaer, Lord of Voorschoten, Duivenvoorde and Veur (1649–1707), married Jacoba van Lyere, heiress of Katwijk, thus founding the branch van Wassenaer tot Catwijck which is still existing. Furthermore, the castles of Hoekelum and Nederhemert were owned by Wassenaer family members until the late 20th century.

At the beginning of the 19th century, all family members were granted the title of baron in the Kingdom of the Netherlands.

Famous scions of the House of Wassenaer
 , the 15th century Hook-favouring mayor of Leiden and viscount of Leiden.
  (1483-1523), in the service of the Habsburgs, Order of the Golden Fleece and last viscount of Leiden.
 Jacob van Wassenaer Obdam, the 17th century admiral.
 Unico Wilhelm van Wassenaer, the 18th century diplomat and composer.

Gallery

See also
Wassenaar, a municipality in South Holland
Westenra, an Irish surname derived from Van Wassenaer

Literature
 J.C. Kort and R.C. Hol: Wassenaer, de oudste: Het archief van de familie Van Wassenaer van Duvenvoorde in Hollands archiefperspectief. Inventaris van het archief van de familie Van Wassenaer van Duvenvoorde, 1266–1996, Verloren b.v., Hilversum, 2002.
Nederland's Adelsboek 97 (2012), p. 131-188.

External links
Website of the van Wassenaer family

Wassenaer
Barons of the Netherlands
 
Wassenaar